The following is a list of notable alumni and faculty of Saint Petersburg State University in Russia.

Alumni

Nobel laureates

Fields medal
Grigori Perelman
Stanislav Smirnov

Academia

Government and politics

Literature and the arts

Science and mathematics

Other
Alexander Alekhine - Russian-French fourth World Chess Champion
Vladas Petronaitis - Lithuanian patriot, soldier and martyr
Józef Pluskowski - Polish poet and member of the Polish Resistance
Yakov Rekhter - co-founder of BGP and MPLS networking protocols
Gennadiy Shatkov - Olympic champion in boxing
Eduard Vinokurov (1942–2010) - Kazakh-born Soviet Olympic and world champion fencer
Mahinda Balasuriya - 32nd Inspector General of the Sri Lanka Police (IGP) (2009–2011).

Faculty only
Leonhard Euler - Swiss mathematician and physicist
Nikolai Gogol -  Russian literature writer of Ukrainian origin; historian
Rada Granovskaya - psychologist
Ivan Sechenov - physiologist
Zare Yusupova  - philologist, Kurdish linguist
Rahul Sankrityayan - Indian independence activist, writer and a polyglot who wrote in Hindi.

References

Alumni list of Saint-Petersburg University

Saint Petersburg State University
State University
Lists of people by university or college in Russia